Senator Pridemore may refer to:

Auburn Pridemore (1837–1900), Virginia State Senate
Craig Pridemore (born 1961), Washington State Senate